Melanomys robustulus, also known as the robust melanomys or robust dark rice rat, is a species of rodent in the genus Melanomys of family Cricetidae. It is found on the eastern slope of the Andes in Ecuador.

References

Literature cited
Musser, G.G. and Carleton, M.D. 2005. Superfamily Muroidea. Pp. 894–1531 in Wilson, D.E. and Reeder, D.M. (eds.). Mammal Species of the World: a taxonomic and geographic reference. 3rd ed. Baltimore: The Johns Hopkins University Press, 2 vols., 2142 pp. 
Tirira, D. and Boada, C. 2008. . In IUCN. IUCN Red List of Threatened Species. Version 2009.2. <www.iucnredlist.org>. Downloaded on November 15, 2009.

Melanomys
Mammals of Ecuador
Mammals described in 1914
Taxa named by Oldfield Thomas
Taxonomy articles created by Polbot